The 2005–06 Bradley Braves men's basketball team represented Bradley University as a member of the Missouri Valley Conference during the 2005–06 NCAA Division I men's basketball season. Led by head coach Jim Les, the Braves finished the season with a 22-11 record (11-7 MVC). They earned an at-large bid to the NCAA tournament as #13 seed in the Oakland Regional. The team defeated Kansas and Pittsburgh to reach the Sweet Sixteen, before falling to Memphis in the regional semifinal.

Recruiting

Roster

Schedule

|-
!colspan=9 style=| Regular season

|-

|-
!colspan=9 style=| Missouri Valley Tournament

|-
!colspan=9 style=| NCAA Tournament

|-

Rankings

Team players in the 2006 NBA draft

References

Bradley Braves men's basketball seasons
Bradley
Brad
Brad
Bradley